Daniel Leon Plante (born October 5, 1971 in Hayward, Wisconsin) is a retired [American professional ice hockey forward who played 159 games in the National Hockey League for the New York Islanders between 1994 and 1998. He was drafted as the New York Islanders' third choice and 48th overall. Internationally Planted played for the American national team at the 1996 and 1997 World Championships. Plante is currently employed as a player agent at Forward Hockey.

Career statistics

Regular season and playoffs

International

Awards and honors

References

External links
 

1971 births
Living people
American men's ice hockey forwards
Chicago Wolves players
Chicago Wolves (IHL) players
Denver Grizzlies players
Ice hockey players from Wisconsin
New York Islanders draft picks
New York Islanders players
People from Hayward, Wisconsin
Salt Lake Golden Eagles (IHL) players
Utah Grizzlies (IHL) players
Wisconsin Badgers men's ice hockey players